Ronald Harold Johnson (born April 8, 1955) is an American accountant, businessman, and politician serving as the senior United States senator from Wisconsin, a seat he has held since 2011. A Republican, Johnson was first elected to the U.S. Senate in 2010, defeating Democratic incumbent Russ Feingold. He was reelected in 2016, defeating Feingold in a rematch, and in 2022, narrowly defeating Lieutenant Governor Mandela Barnes.

Born in Mankato, Minnesota, Johnson attended high school in Edina, Minnesota, a suburb of the Twin Cities, and received a degree from the University of Minnesota. Before entering politics, he was chief executive officer of a polyester and plastics manufacturer in Oshkosh, Wisconsin, founded by his brother-in-law.

A staunch ally of President Donald Trump, Johnson voted for Trump's Tax Cuts and Jobs Act in 2017, supported Trump's decision to end Deferred Action for Childhood Arrivals (DACA), launched investigations into his political opponents and promoted false claims of fraud in relation to Trump's defeat in the 2020 presidential election. He has rejected the scientific consensus on climate change. During the COVID-19 pandemic, Johnson voted for the CARES Act, resisted stay at home orders, used his chairmanship of the Senate Homeland Security Committee to invite witnesses who promoted fringe theories about COVID-19 and spread misinformation about COVID-19 vaccinations.

Early life and education
Johnson was born in Mankato, Minnesota, the son of Jeanette Elizabeth (née Thisius) and Dale Robert Johnson. His father was of Norwegian descent and his mother of German ancestry. Growing up, Johnson delivered newspapers, worked as a caddy at a golf course, baled hay on his uncle's dairy farm, and worked as a dishwasher in a restaurant. He attended Edina High School but skipped his senior year and graduated from the University of Minnesota in 1977 with a bachelor's degree in business and accounting. He continued his studies but did not receive a graduate degree.

Business career
In 1979, Johnson moved to Oshkosh, Wisconsin, with his wife, Jane. He worked for his wife's family's plastics company, PACUR, an abbreviation of "Pat Curler", Jane's brother. Curler created the company with funding from his and Jane's father, Howard Curler. Howard Curler had been named CEO of the plastics giant Bemis Company in 1978, and for the first several years of PACUR's existence, Bemis was the company's only customer.

According to his campaign biography, Johnson worked as PACUR's accountant and a machine operator. The company later expanded into specialty plastics used in medical device packaging, which involved hiring salespeople and exporting products to other countries. In the mid-1980s, Pat Curler left PACUR and Johnson became its CEO. In 1987, the Curler family sold PACUR to Bowater Industries for $18 million; Johnson remained the company's CEO. In 1997, he purchased PACUR from Bowater; he remained CEO until he was elected to the Senate in 2010.

U.S. Senate

Elections

2010

The 2010 U.S. Senate campaign was Johnson's first run for elected office. According to The New York Times, Johnson said he "did kind of spring out of the Tea Party" and is glad to be associated with it, although he did not join the Senate Tea Party Caucus following his election. In the September 14, 2010, Republican primary, Johnson, running a largely self-financed campaign, defeated Watertown businessman Dave Westlake with 85% of the vote to Westlake's 10% and 5% for Stephen Finn.
 
As a candidate, Johnson opposed the American Recovery and Reinvestment Act of 2009. He launched his campaign by telling the Milwaukee Journal Sentinel that the United States "would have been far better off not spending any of the money and [letting] the recovery happen as it was going to happen." The newspaper later reported that the education council Johnson led considered applying for stimulus money in 2009, but ultimately elected not to. The Johnson campaign stated that nonprofits consider "many possibilities," but that the council "made no application" for stimulus funds.

Johnson's 2010 Senate campaign raised $15.2 million, $9 million of which was his own money. In June 2011, his financial disclosures showed that PACUR had paid him $10 million in deferred compensation in early 2011. The compensation covered the period from 1997 to 2011, during which he took no salary from PACUR. Johnson said that, as CEO, he had personally determined the dollar amount and that it was unrelated to the contributions he had made to his campaign.

In the November 2 election, Johnson defeated Democratic incumbent Russ Feingold with 52% of the vote.

After being elected to the Senate, Johnson claimed that he sold his liquid assets to avoid a conflict of interest and also promised to place his assets in a blind trust.

2016

In March 2013, Johnson announced that he would seek reelection in 2016. In November 2014, he was again endorsed by the fiscally conservative Club for Growth; that month, he said he would not self-finance his reelection bid. In December 2014, the Washington Post rated Johnson the most vulnerable incumbent U.S. senator in the 2016 election cycle. In May 2015, Feingold announced that he would run to win the Senate seat back.

In the November 8 general election, Johnson was reelected with 50.2% of the vote.

2022 

Despite a pledge in 2016 to retire after two terms in the Senate, Johnson announced in January 2022 that he would run for a third term. He faced the Democratic nominee, Wisconsin Lieutenant Governor Mandela Barnes, in the general election. Johnson debated Barnes in October 2022; when each was asked to say something favorable about his opponent, Barnes praised Johnson as a "family man", while Johnson said Barnes had a "good upbringing" and used that to question why Barnes had "turned against America".

In the November 8 general election, Johnson defeated Barnes with 50.4% of the vote.

Committee assignments
 Committee on Foreign Relations
 Subcommittee on Europe and Regional Security Cooperation (ranking member)
 Committee on the Budget
 Committee on Homeland Security and Governmental Affairs
 Subcommittee on Oversight of Government Management, the Federal Workforce and the District of Columbia
 Subcommittee on Federal Financial Management, Government Information and International Security
 Ad Hoc Subcommittee on Disaster Recovery and Intergovernmental Affairs
 Committee on Commerce, Science, and Transportation

Political positions

Economy 

In 2021, Johnson expressed support for "increasing the minimum wage to some extent" (the federal minimum wage had been $7.25/hour since 2009). In 2022, he said it was better for the "marketplace" to decide wages rather than having a government-mandated minimum wage.

Environment, climate change and energy
Johnson rejects the scientific consensus on climate change, describing it in 2021 as "bullshit." In a 2010 interview, he called attributing global warming to manmade causes "crazy," saying the theory is "lunacy," and attributed climate change to causes other than human activity. Johnson also suggested carbon dioxide was good for the environment, as it "helps the trees grow." In dismissing the effects of climate change, Johnson falsely claimed that Greenland was green when it was discovered and had become white and snow-clad over time as a result of cooling temperatures. In August 2015, Johnson baselessly claimed that "the climate hasn't warmed in quite a few years. That is proven scientifically," although record world temperatures were reached that year and in 2014. Johnson co-sponsored the Energy Tax Prevention Act, which would block the EPA from imposing new rules on carbon emissions. In an October 7, 2022, Senate campaign debate, Johnson said, "The climate has always changed and always will change, so I don’t deny climate change", repeating a similar statement he made in February 2016.

When asked about allowing additional drilling for oil in the continental US, including the Great Lakes if oil were found there, Johnson responded, "We have to get the oil where it is, but we need to do it responsibly. We need to utilize American ingenuity and American technology to make sure we do it environmentally sensitively and safely." After criticism from the Feingold campaign, Johnson said in July 2010 that his answer did not mean he supported drilling in the Great Lakes.

Fiscal issues
During Obama's presidency, Johnson was a fiscal hawk who called for federal spending cuts. He was involved in the deals to raise the debt ceiling in July 2011 and January 2013. Johnson said that the 2011 debate over whether to increase the US debt ceiling presented an opportunity to establish hard caps on federal spending. He argued that Congress could not keep raising the debt limit, and needed to prioritize spending. Johnson called for open negotiations over the debt ceiling, saying that the closed-door talks were "outrageous" and "disgusting." He said that default should not have been a concern, because the government had plenty of funding to pay interest on debt, Social Security benefits, and salary for soldiers. In January 2013, Johnson voted for the fiscal cliff agreement that reduced pending tax increases and delayed spending cuts precipitated by the 2011 debt ceiling deal. When asked whether he would get rid of home mortgage interest deductions (claiming mortgage interest as a tax-deductible expense), he said he "wouldn't rule it out" as part of an effort to lower taxes and simplify the tax code.

During the Trump administration, Johnson defended tax cuts, falsely claiming that they reduced the deficit. He voted for the Tax Cuts and Jobs Act of 2017, having conditioned his support on increasing tax cuts for pass-through companies. The tax cut benefited, among others, Richard and Elizabeth Uihlein and Diane Hendricks, who had contributed $20 million to Johnson's reelection campaign.

During the economic recession that coincided with the COVID-19 pandemic, Johnson voted for the CARES Act in March 2020, but staunchly opposed further stimulus. In December 2020, he sought to block a bipartisan proposal to provide $1,200 in COVID-19-related stimulus checks, citing the national debt.

In March 2021, Johnson sought to obstruct and delay passage of the American Rescue Plan Act. Breaking from Senate norms, he forced a 10-hour reading of the bill on the grounds that the Senate did not have enough time to read the bill.

In August 2022, Johnson criticized the federal Social Security and Medicare programs for contributing to debt by being "on automatic pilot": "If you qualify for the entitlement, you just get it no matter what the cost"; he proposed instead to "turn everything into discretionary spending", which would result in programs needing to be approved by Congress every year. Johnson also called Social Security an unsustainable "Ponzi Scheme".

Gun policy
In 2013, Johnson was a cosponsor of Senate 570, a bill that would prohibit the Department of Justice from tracking and cataloging the purchases of multiple rifles and shotguns. In April 2013, Johnson was one of 12 Republican senators to sign a letter threatening to filibuster any newly introduced gun control legislation. That month, Johnson joined 45 other senators in defeating the Manchin-Toomey Amendment, which would have required background checks on all sales of guns, including between individuals. Johnson had received about $1.2 million in contributions from firearms interests since his 2010 Senate campaign. His 2022 campaign had a radio spot produced that began, "The latest mass murder in America didn't involve guns." It equated the recent accidental deaths of 53 immigrants in Texas during President Joe Biden's tenure with mass homicide. Before it aired, the campaign hastened to pull it, as the broadcasts would have followed the July 4, 2022, Highland Park parade shooting too closely. Seven people died and 46 were wounded in the shooting. The alleged shooter then drove directly to Madison, Wisconsin, allegedly intending to continue his rampage at that city's Independence Day parade. Days after a Texas 18-year-old killed 19 elementary school students and two teachers on May 24, 2022, Johnson said he opposed passing new firearms laws. Johnson told Fox News correspondent Neil Cavuto that the failure to teach "values" in schools had led to the school massacre, a remark Governor Tony Evers called "breathtaking." Cavuto countered Johnson's claim during the interview, saying that such shootings had "been going on long before CRT and wokeness."

Health care
Johnson opposes the Affordable Care Act (ACA or "Obamacare") and has voted to repeal it. In 2013, Johnson declined to support efforts to tie funding the federal government to defunding ACA, noting that such efforts were highly unlikely to succeed given Obama's opposition. In 2014, he criticized Congress's ability to continue using pretax employer contributions to help pay for their medical care and filed a federal lawsuit seeking to block ACA exemptions to members of Congress and their staff. The suit was dismissed for lack of standing, and the U.S. Court of Appeals for the Seventh Circuit upheld the dismissal on appeal.

In an August 2017 interview, Johnson said of Senator John McCain's "thumbs-down" vote that killed the Republican bill to repeal the ACA, "He has a brain tumor right now. The vote occurred at 1:30 in the morning. So some of that might have factored in." A McCain spokesman called the statements "bizarre and deeply unfortunate." Johnson later said he was "disappointed I didn't more eloquently express my sympathy for what Sen. McCain is going through."

In 2022, Johnson said that Republicans should repeal the ACA if they take control after the 2022 elections.

Abortion

In 2011, Johnson co-sponsored a federal bill that would grant all fetuses the same rights and protections as people, with no exceptions for fetuses arising from rape or incest. From 2013 to 2021, he supported bills that banned abortion after 20 weeks of conception except in cases of incest, rape, or when the mother's life is in danger. In 2021, Johnson also supported a request for the Supreme Court to uphold a Mississippi law banning abortion after 15 weeks, with exceptions for "severe fetal abnormality" or medical emergency, but none for rape and incest.

Johnson opposes funding research that uses embryonic stem cells. He has said he disagrees with it morally and that eliminating funding for the research would help balance the federal budget. He supported Dobbs v. Jackson Women's Health Organization, the U.S. Supreme Court ruling that overturned Roe v. Wade, calling it a "victory for life." Johnson said did not see that decision "as a huge threat to women's health" and suggested that those who did not like it "can move" from Wisconsin to another state.

COVID-19 pandemic

During the COVID-19 pandemic, Johnson voted against the Families First Coronavirus Response Act, which passed the Senate on March 18, 2020, by a vote of 90–8. In an interview with the Milwaukee Journal Sentinel, Johnson said he was aware "what a nasty disease COVID-19 can be, and how it's obviously devastating to somewhere between 1 and 3.4 percent of the population... [b]ut we don't shut down our economy because tens of thousands of people die on the highways. It's a risk we accept so we can move about. We don't shut down our economies because tens of thousands of people die from the common flu". His comments were met with criticism that he was "playing down" the threat of COVID-19. Johnson responded that he was "just trying to look at this very realistically".

Johnson used his position as chair of the Senate Homeland Security Committee to invite witnesses to hearings to promote fringe theories about COVID-19. The witnesses promoted unproven drugs, made dubious claims about COVID-19 spread and pushed skepticism about vaccines. Johnson called pulmonologist Pierre Kory to testify about his experiences with Ivermectin, as well as a medical doctor who "has cast doubts on coronavirus vaccines and has pushed for the use of hydroxychloroquine", and a cardiologist who disagrees with "settled science".  After the FDA revoked the emergency use authorization from hydroxychloroquine in June 2020, Johnson and two other senators wrote the agency in August for an explanation of why the FDA was unresponsive to Trump administration officials' calls to reauthorize the drug as a COVID-19 treatment.

Johnson peddled misinformation about COVID-19 vaccines during the pandemic. Asked about COVID-19 vaccines in March 2021, he refused to say whether they were safe (as medical experts had determined) or to encourage people to get vaccinated. In April 2021, he downplayed the need for widespread COVID-19 vaccinations. Johnson has falsely suggested that people who have contracted COVID do not need to be vaccinated, and that there is no need for young people to be vaccinated. These claims contradict known science and the recommendations of health officials, who note that herd immunity is the most effective to halt COVID-19's spread and severity. In December 2021 he recommended mouthwash as a treatment for the coronavirus during a town hall meeting, immediately drawing criticism. A dental-professional-focused website run by Listerine, one of the world’s most widely used mouthwash products, specifically says the evidence is not strong enough to conclude that it is helpful against COVID-19.

In May 2021, Johnson falsely claimed that thousands of deaths were connected to COVID vaccinations. He also falsely stated that there was a risk of death for people previously infected with COVID who received the vaccine. YouTube suspended Johnson from posting videos on the platform for seven days over his remarks touting unproven treatments for COVID-19.

After Twitter suspended Alex Berenson for making false claims about the pandemic and vaccines, Johnson praised him as "a courageous voice of reason" and encouraged people to continue reading Berenson's writing on another site.

In an October 2021 interview on Tucker Carlson Tonight, Johnson falsely claimed that ivermectin was being suppressed as a COVID-19 treatment in favor of expensive COVID-19 drugs developed by the pharmaceutical industry, and that "the Pfizer vaccine available in the U.S. is not FDA-approved" because it was not the "Comirnaty version". "Comirnaty" is the United States Adopted Name that was assigned to the Pfizer vaccine after it the FDA approved it. Doses produced before the approval contain no formulaic differences from those produced afterward, and are interchangeable.

Immigration
Johnson supported Trump's decision to end Deferred Action for Childhood Arrivals (DACA), which he said was unconstitutional and "created incentives for children from Central America to take great risks to enter America illegally." Trump's decision made eligible for deportation, after a six-month waiting period, the approximately 800,000 unauthorized immigrants who entered the country as minors and had temporary permission to stay in the country.

In 2021, Johnson lent credence to the "Great Replacement" conspiracy theory promoted by white supremacists that holds that white people are being purposely replaced by nonwhite people in the West. On conservative media broadcasts, Johnson repeatedly referred to the supposed "Democrat grand plan," endorsing the theory, saying, "I've got to believe they want to change the makeup of the electorate."

Judiciary
Johnson is one of the Senate Republicans who favored the "nuclear option" of ending the filibuster "to speed up consideration of President Trump's nominees" because changing the Senate's rules to a simple majority vote would "ensure a quicker pace on Trump's court picks".

In 2022, Johnson blocked a Biden administration nominee, William Pocan, from serving as a federal district court judge in Wisconsin. The previous year, Johnson and Wisconsin Senator Tammy Baldwin jointly recommended Pocan. In justifying blocking Pocan, Johnson referenced the Mayfair Mall shooting in Wauwatosa. Pocan had no involvement in the Wauwatosa shooting.

Social issues

In March 2015, Johnson voted for an amendment to establish a deficit-neutral reserve fund to allow all employees in the country to earn paid sick time.

In 2015, Johnson was one of 11 Senate Republicans to vote to allow same-sex spouses to have access to federal Social Security and veterans' benefits.

In July 2022, Johnson initially expressed support for the Respect for Marriage Act, which would codify same-sex marriage into federal law. Johnson reversed his stance in September 2022, saying he "would not support it in its current state". He voted against the act in November 2022.

Marijuana policy
Johnson has a "D" rating from NORML for his voting record on cannabis-related matters.

Statute of limitations for sex abuse lawsuits
In January 2010, before holding elective office, Johnson opposed a Wisconsin bill that would have eliminated the time limit for future child sexual abuse victims to bring lawsuits while allowing an additional three years for past victims to sue. He testified before the Wisconsin Senate that "punishment for the actual perpetrators should be severe", but questioned whether it would be just for employers of perpetrators to be financially affected by lawsuits. He added that the bill, if enacted, might reduce the reporting of child sexual abuse. At the time of his testimony, Johnson was on the Finance Council of the Roman Catholic Diocese of Green Bay.

In June 2010 he told the Milwaukee Journal Sentinel: "I can't think of a penalty that would be too harsh for these guys", and in late September 2010 said that the legislation would have financially crippled organizations such as the Boys & Girls Clubs and that the punishment for child sexual abuse should be "severe and swift." He also addressed reports about his testimony, saying, "I sought to warn legislators of those consequences in order to correct legislative language so that any bills that passed would punish the perpetrators and those that protect them, not honorable organizations that do so much good for our communities. We must rid our society of people who prey on children."

Trade 
In November 2018, Johnson was one of 12 Republican senators to sign a letter to Trump requesting the United States-Mexico-Canada Agreement be submitted to Congress by the end of the month to allow a vote on it before the end of the year, as they were concerned that "passage of the USMCA as negotiated will become significantly more difficult" if it had to be approved by the incoming 116th Congress.

Donald Trump support 
Johnson has been an unwavering supporter of former President Donald Trump, and attacked Senator Mitt Romney for his vote to allow witnesses in a Trump impeachment trial. Asked subsequently about the confrontation with Romney, Johnson told reporters, "those are private conversations," continuing, "That's grotesque you guys are recording," with a reporter noting the press is permitted to witness the proceedings. Johnson dismissively remarked that an impeachment vote would simply "inflame the situation".

As chair of the Senate Homeland Security Committee, Johnson launched multiple investigations into Trump's political opponents, including Joe Biden. In September 2020, after saying for months that he was undertaking an investigation that would demonstrate Biden's "unfitness for office", Johnson released a report that found no evidence of wrongdoing by Biden in relation to Ukraine. Johnson's report reiterated unproven allegations, many of which had been elements of Russian disinformation campaigns meant to smear Biden.

In January 2018, Johnson said he had an informant with information that the FBI and Department of Justice had conspired against Trump in the 2016 presidential election; Johnson called it a "secret society" and said there was "corruption at the highest levels of the FBI". Later that day, Johnson said he had based these claims on FBI agents Peter Strzok and Lisa Page's text messages, but conceded that he could not fully ascertain the messages' meaning. In February 2018, Johnson further suggested that a text message between Strzok and Page raised questions about "the type and extent of President Obama's personal involvement" in the investigation into Hillary Clinton's email server. But the message in question, which said, "Potus wants to know everything we're doing", referred to the FBI investigation into Russian interference in the 2016 election, not the Clinton email investigation, which had concluded months earlier.

In April 2019, Johnson defended Trump's statement that some high-level FBI agents were "scum", and said "I think there's a proven fact there was definitely corruption at the highest levels of the FBI." In 2021, Johnson confirmed reporting that the FBI warned him (in August 2020) that he was a target of Russian disinformation. In 2022, Johnson described the August 2020 warning as that the "FBI set me up with a corrupt briefing and then leaked that to smear me".

Trump–Ukraine scandal 

Johnson became an important figure in the 2019 controversy surrounding U.S. aid to Ukraine. He joined the U.S. delegation at the inauguration of the new president of Ukraine in May with National Security Council official Lieutenant Colonel Alexander Vindman and the "Three Amigos" (U.S. Ambassador to the European Union Gordon Sondland, Energy Secretary Rick Perry, and then-special envoy to Ukraine Kurt Volker).

In August 2019, Sondland told Johnson that military aid for Ukraine was linked to Trump's push for Ukraine to investigate the origins of special counsel Robert Mueller's probe. In October 2019, amid the impeachment inquiry into Trump, Johnson asserted that Trump had told him in August that he might withhold aid to Ukraine "because of alleged corruption involving the 2016 U.S. election. Johnson stood by the president, saying he was sympathetic to his concerns and didn't see any bad motives on his part". Johnson has said that he asked Trump whether the aid to Ukraine was linked to the launch of the Biden investigation, and that Trump replied that it was not and asked him who had said that. Johnson replied that it was Sondland, and Trump asserted that "he barely knew him."

In November 2019, at the request of House Intelligence Committee ranking member Devin Nunes and temporary member Jim Jordan, Johnson provided a detailed timeline of his involvement in the Ukraine situation. In February 2016, he was one of eight senators who signed a letter to then-Ukrainian President Petro Poroshenko urging reforms in the office of the Ukrainian prosecutor Viktor Shokin. On October 3, 2019, Johnson told reporters he did not recall signing the letter, which contradicts Trump's allegations that Biden had improperly pushed for Shokin's removal.

The same day, Johnson also said that there was nothing wrong with Trump asking China, in October 2019, to start an investigation into Joe and Hunter Biden, although there is no evidence of any wrongdoing by the Bidens in China. Johnson has been one of the few Republican senators to defend Trump's efforts to get Ukraine and China to investigate Biden (then a potential 2020 Democratic presidential candidate) and his son. Sondland told the House Intelligence Committee, "I shared concerns of the potential quid pro quo regarding the security aid with Senator Ron Johnson."

Johnson went to Ukrainian President Volodymyr Zelensky's inauguration. Meeting later with Trump, he discussed Zelensky and the aid to Ukraine Trump had withheld, urging him to release it. He approached Trump after a U.S. diplomat informed him that its release was contingent on Ukraine's willingness to conduct investigations Trump sought regarding the 2016 election. He said he was disturbed by any linkage of the actions or the existence of a quid pro quo but became satisfied after Trump personally denied to him that the release was tied to political investigations. On November 26, however, the New York Times reported that Trump had been briefed about a whistleblower complaint involving a quid pro quo before releasing the withheld military aid to Ukraine.

Johnson also met in 2019 with Ukraine diplomat Andrii Telizhenko about Ukraine's alleged interference in the 2016 U.S. presidential election. The State Department revoked Telizhenko's visa in October 2020, and CNN reported the U.S. government was considering sanctioning him as a Russian agent. Johnson has promoted conspiracy theories that the FBI and CIA have sabotaged Trump.

In November 2019, he suggested that Vindman, who testified about Trump's phone call to Zelensky, might have participated in efforts to oppose Trump's policies and remove him from office, saying it was "entirely possible." Michael Volkov, Vindman's lawyer, called Johnson's attack "such a baseless accusation, so ridiculous on its face, that it doesn’t even warrant a response."

Vindman's widowed father brought him and his twin brother to the U.S. when they were three years old. He is a decorated veteran from the Iraq war, having received a Purple Heart after being wounded in an IED blast. He is fluent in Russian and Ukrainian. He was previously posted to the U.S. Embassy in Moscow. The Washington Post wrote, "Johnson's letter intensified a campaign of attacks on Vindman from Trump and his allies, which has included speculation about the decorated war veteran's patriotism from conservative commentators and a White House statement on Friday criticizing his job performance."

Johnson criticized Trump for firing Sondland, calling Sondland "a patriot". After Trump fired State Department Inspector General Steve Linick and replaced him with an ally, Johnson said, "I'm not crying big crocodile tears over this termination."

2020 presidential election 
After Biden's victory in the 2020 presidential election and Trump's subsequent refusal to concede, Johnson agreed with several of Trump's false claims of widespread electoral fraud. While ballots were counted during the 2020 election, he said that half the country would not accept a Biden win, and made unsubstantiated claims of "voter fraud that the mainstream media and, unfortunately, many officials just simply ignore." He made further baseless claims that Democrats had "gamed the system" in Wisconsin. A former Wisconsin Republican Party official claimed that Johnson had confided in a November phone call that he knew the election was legitimate but did not say so publicly for fear of political backlash from the party's pro-Trump faction. Johnson denied the allegations, calling the article a "a political hit piece".

Johnson refused to acknowledge Biden's victory until December 16, when he acknowledged that the election was legitimate and said he would not raise an objection to the counting of the electoral votes. After doing so, Johnson, as chairman of the Homeland Security committee, argued "that there was some unknown incidence of fraud, but it hadn't been shown to have occurred on a scale that would have changed the outcome". Nevertheless, in January 2021, he announced his intention to object to the certification of the Electoral College results. Ultimately, however, Johnson reversed this stance and voted against both of the objections raised during the 2021 Electoral College vote count. Regardless, the day after the count was interrupted by the 2021 storming of the United States Capitol, the Milwaukee Journal Sentinel called for Johnson, as well as other members of the so-called "Sedition Caucus", such as Representatives Scott Fitzgerald and Tom Tiffany, to resign or be expelled from Congress.

2021 U.S. Capitol attack

The House Select Committee on the January 6, 2021, Capitol Attack revealed that Johnson's aide Sean Riley texted Chris Hodgson, an aide to Vice President Mike Pence, to request that Johnson personally give Pence an envelope containing alternate electors for Michigan and Wisconsin, which were later determined to be fraudulent. Hodgson refused to do so. In March 2022, Johnson's campaign hired Pam Travis as a full-time aide, although she had signed a statement as one of Wisconsin's ten "fake electors," who challenged the legitimacy of the state's delegation to the Electoral College. While walking outside the Capitol and pretending to be on a phone call, Johnson claimed he was not aware of the contents of the envelope.

In February 2021, Johnson suggested that Nancy Pelosi sought a second impeachment of Trump to "deflect" from "what [she] knew and when [she] knew it". Johnson voted for a measure declaring that Trump's impeachment over his role in inciting the storming of the Capitol was unconstitutional. He later voted to acquit Trump. After Trump's acquittal, Johnson downplayed the storming of the Capitol on a conservative talk show, saying of the attack, "To call that an armed insurrection, it was the most pitiful armed insurrection anybody could ever possibly imagine." Politifact rated Johnson's statement a "Pants on Fire" falsehood.

Although 140 police officers were injured in the attack, Johnson added in a March 2021 radio interview that he hadn't been concerned for his safety when rioters stormed the Capitol because they "loved their country", but that he might have been concerned if the rioters had been from Black Lives Matter or Antifa. Responding to bipartisan criticism of his comment as racist, Johnson said, "I completely did not anticipate that anybody could interpret what I said as racist. It’s not."

In May 2021, Johnson voted against creating the January 6 commission.

Repeating a conspiracy theory, in August 2021, Johnson suggested that the FBI must have had more foreknowledge than has been disclosed about the Capitol attack. A spokesperson for Johnson said, "the revelation of the depth of the FBI's involvement in the Governor Whitmer plot raises questions as to whether it had infiltrated January 6 agitator groups as well".

Hunter Biden investigation 
Johnson has been one of the leading figures calling for an investigation into Hunter Biden's connections to Ukraine. He has accused Biden of soliciting prostitutes and potential involvement in sex trafficking.

House Republicans have spoken about opening such an investigation into Biden. Despite his support, Johnson denies wanting to "target individuals".

Electoral history

Personal life
Johnson and his wife Jane reside in Oshkosh, Wisconsin. They have three children. He is a member of the Wisconsin Evangelical Lutheran Synod.

On October 3, 2020, Johnson announced that he had tested positive for COVID-19. After exposure on September 14, he quarantined until September 28. He tested negative twice during the quarantine, and was asymptomatic, but tested positive again later and returned to isolation. While awaiting a COVID-19 test result, Johnson attended a fundraising event.

References

External links

 Senator Ron Johnson official U.S. Senate website
 Ron Johnson for Senate

 
 
 Bemis business website
 
 Related U.S. Senate website

|-

|-

|-

|-

1955 births
Living people
21st-century American politicians
American Lutherans
American manufacturing businesspeople
American nationalists
American people of German descent
American people of Norwegian descent
Businesspeople from Wisconsin
Carlson School of Management alumni
COVID-19 conspiracy theorists
Edina High School alumni
Lutherans from Wisconsin
Politicians from Mankato, Minnesota
Politicians from Oshkosh, Wisconsin
Commanders of the Order of the Star of Romania
Republican Party United States senators from Wisconsin
Tea Party movement activists
Wisconsin Republicans